was a Japanese professor of Urdu. He was known in Pakistan as Japan's "Baba-e-Urdu" (Father of Urdu) for his work in the promotion of the language.

Career
Suzuki studied at the University of Karachi from 1960 to 1962 on a Pakistani government scholarship. He joined the faculty of the Tokyo University of Foreign Studies in 1963. Among his students was Hiroji Kataoka, a self-described failing student who, inspired by Suzuki's teaching, himself would go on to become a professor of Urdu and make important contributions to Urdu studies in Japan. In 1996, the Pakistani government conferred the civil decoration Sitara-i-Imtiaz upon him.

Death
After a long battle with cancer, Suzuki died on 14 January 2005. The Department of Urdu at the University of Karachi held a condolence ceremony in his memory. He left behind an unfinished manuscript of a 20,000-word Urdu-Japanese dictionary, which is being finalised for publication by his colleague Hiroshi Hagita. His personal library contained a number of rare books, which he left to TUFS after his death.

Works

Textbooks
Suzuki's Urdu textbooks have become part of the standard Urdu curriculum in Japan. Among his major pedagogical works are:

Literary translations
In the late 1980s, Suzuki worked with his student Hiroji Kataoka on translation of the short stories of Saadat Hasan Manto into Japanese. He later collaborated with Muhammad Rais Alavi of the University of Karachi on translation of Japanese poetry into Urdu, including the Man'yōshū and Sankashū (a 12th-century waka collection).

References

1932 births
2005 deaths
Deaths from cancer in Japan
Academic staff of Tokyo University of Foreign Studies
Japanese expatriates in Pakistan
Recipients of Sitara-i-Imtiaz
Urdu–Japanese translators
Japanese–Urdu translators
University of Karachi alumni
20th-century Japanese translators